Glitch! is a 1988 American comedy film directed by Nico Mastorakis.  It involves two petty thieves who accidentally become casting directors of a film with a large number of beautiful girls, and later they must dodge the Mafia.

Plot
Two thieves rob a large fancy house when the owner is away, but when a visitor mistakes them for the owner, and they find out about a casting party misscheduled for that day, they decide to stick around for fun. They have only one small problem, though. The real owners owe some bad dudes a lot of money, and they show up to collect it.

Cast 
 Will Egan as T.C.
 Steve Donmyer as Bo
 Bunty Bailey as Bimbo
 Julia Nickson as Michelle Wong
 Ji-Tu Cumbuka as Mookie
 Fernando Garzon as Paco Galino
 John Kreng as Lee
 Richard Gautier as Julius Lazar
 Ted Lange as Dubois
 Amy Lyndon as Missy
 Dallas Cole as Faye

References

External links
 
 
 

1988 films
1980s sex comedy films
American sex comedy films
1980s English-language films
Teen sex comedy films
1988 comedy films
Films directed by Nico Mastorakis
1980s American films